Fode Dabo is a Sierra Leonean diplomat who is Sierra Leone's ambassador to Belgium. He is also Sierra Leone's ambassador to France, Netherlands, Luxembourg, Italy, and the Holy See. Dabo is a Muslim and hails from the Mandingo ethnic group.

External links
http://news.sl/drwebsite/publish/article_200528733.shtml

Sierra Leonean diplomats
Living people
Ambassadors of Sierra Leone to Belgium
Ambassadors of Sierra Leone to France
Ambassadors of Sierra Leone to the Netherlands
Ambassadors of Sierra Leone to Luxembourg
Ambassadors of Sierra Leone to Italy
Ambassadors of Sierra Leone to the Holy See
Sierra Leonean Muslims
Sierra Leonean Mandingo people
Year of birth missing (living people)